t Kabel is a hamlet in the Dutch province of North Holland. It is a part of the municipality of Haarlemmermeer, and lies just southeast of Nieuw-Vennep and about 6 km southwest of Hoofddorp.

Kabel has a population of around 100.

References

Haarlemmermeer
Populated places in North Holland